Syncopacma taeniolella is a moth of the family Gelechiidae. It is found in most of Europe.

The wingspan is 10–13 mm. The forewings are bronzy-black, somewhat lighter basally; a nearly straight narrow white fascia beyond middle. Hindwings are fuscous, darker posteriorly. Under-surface with white fascia distinct across forewings and forming a costal spot on hindwings. The larva is pale ochreous-yellowish; 3-12 with broad dull red transverse bands, on 3 and 4 somewhat interrupted; head yellow-brown; plate of 2 yellow-brown, posteriorly blackish-marked 
 
Adults are on wing in July.

The larvae feed on Lotus corniculatus, Lotus uliginosus, Medicago and Trifolium species. They initially mine the leaves of their host plant. The mine consists of an irregular blotchy rather small mine. Soon the larvae leave the mine, and start mining from between few spun leaves. Larvae can be found in May and June.

References

Moths described in 1839
Syncopacma
Moths of Europe
Insects of Turkey